Kiangsuaspis nankingensis is an extinct phyllocarid crustaceans from Late Silurian China.  It was originally described in 1962 by Kiang P'an as an incomplete ventral plate of a cyathaspidid heterostracan agnathan with a unique pattern of raised, sculptured tubercles that fuse together into anastomosing ridges.  In 1984, Jiang P'an then reappraised it as a ceratiocaridid crustacean.

References

Prehistoric Malacostraca
Prehistoric crustacean genera
Silurian crustaceans